Black-and-gray (also black-and-grey, black and grey/gray) is a style of tattooing that uses only black ink in varying shades.  This tattooing style is thought to have originated from prisons in the 1970s and 1980s and was later popularized in tattoo parlors.

Origin
Black-and-gray is sometimes referred to as "jailhouse" or "joint style" and is thought to have originated in prisons where inmates had limited access to different materials; they resorted to using guitar strings for needles and used cigarette ashes or pen ink to produce tattoos.  Inmates would construct makeshift tattoo machines that were powered using the small motors available in tape players.  Prisons generally prohibit inmates from tattooing, so these were likely to be done in secret.  During the late 1970s and early 1980s, jailhouse then became popularized in tattoo parlors outside of prison and was renamed "black and gray".  Black-and-gray is also thought to have originated from the Chicano or cholo culture in Los Angeles.

Technique
Typically, black-and-gray tattoo work is produced by diluting the black ink with distilled water in varying proportions to create a "wash" that results in lighter shades.  Gray shades can also be produced by mixing small amounts of black ink with white ink, which produces a thicker but brighter result and requires a slower application.  Shading is typically an important component for these types of tattoos as they will fade over a period of years without strong black tones, which provide contrast and allows the tattoo to stand out.  Subtle kinds of shading in black-and-gray are considered to require a high level of skill and illustrates professionalism in the industry.

Common usage

Black-and-gray techniques are often employed for a variety of tattoos.  Japanese irezumi, such as the rising koi, are traditionally done using black-and-gray, although colored irezumi sometimes use black-and-gray backgrounds in a manner similar to sumi-e brushwork.  Classic Chicano tattoos — which include a broad range of imagery such as icons in Catholicism or the Mexican flag and partially originated from prison life — are also normally done in black-and-gray.  Photo-realistic portraits are also commonly done in black-and-gray, and typically resist deterioration better than color portraits.

In some color tattoos, artists can use black-and-gray initially to provide a foundation for the subsequent shading using colors.  The colored ink can be added directly above the black-and-gray portions of the tattoo.

Examples

References

Tattooing